The Pajama Game is a musical based on the 1953 novel 7½ Cents by Richard Bissell.
The book is by George Abbott and Richard Bissell; the music and lyrics are by Richard Adler and Jerry Ross. Dances were staged by Bob Fosse in his choreography debut. The story deals with labor troubles and romance in a pajama factory.

The original Broadway production opened on May 13, 1954, at the St. James Theatre, and ran for 1,063 performances, with a brief stop at the Shubert Theatre at the end of the run. It was revived in 1973, and again in 2006 by The Roundabout Theatre Company. The original production, produced by Frederick Brisson, Robert E. Griffith and Harold S. Prince, won a Tony Award for Best Musical. The 2006 Broadway revival won a Tony Award for Best Revival of a Musical.  The musical is a popular choice for community and school group productions.

The original West End production opened at the London Coliseum on October 13, 1955, where it ran for 588 performances.

Characters
Sid Sorokin, the handsome new factory superintendent who falls in love with Babe, despite their being on opposite sides of the labor dispute central to the plot.
Katherine "Babe" Williams, the leader of the Union Grievance Committee, who falls in love with Sid.
Myron "Old Man" Hasler, the strict head of the pajama factory who keeps a secret.
Gladys Hotchkiss, Hasler's attractive, quick-witted secretary, who dates Hines and is chased by Prez.
Vernon Hines, the factory timekeeper, who thinks Gladys flirts too much and, as a result is always jealous.
Prez, the head of the union and a skirt chaser, despite being a married man.
Mabel, the mother hen of the factory and Sid's secretary.
Mae, a loud-mouthed member of the Grievance Committee, who accepts Prez's advances, much to his surprise.
Pop, Babe's kind and agreeable father.
Max, a salesman.
Charley, a worker in the factory and the handyman.
Joe, a factory worker and Prez's right-hand man.
Brenda, a member of the Grievance Committee.
Virginia, a factory girl and union activist.
Poopsie, a factory girl and union activist.
Gus, an unhappy factory helper who Sid shoves.

Plot
Act I

Vernon Hines, the efficiency expert at the Sleep-Tite Pajama Factory in Cedar Rapids, Iowa, breaks the fourth wall to introduce the story ("The Pajama Game Opening"). Inside the factory, workers churn out pajamas at a backbreaking pace ("Racing with the Clock"). In the middle of this, Sid Sorokin, has come from out of town to work in the factory as the new superintendent ("A New Town Is a Blue Town"). The union, led by Prez, is seeking a wage raise of seven-and-a-half cents an hour, though the company president, Myron Hasler, refuses to give way. Katherine "Babe" Williams is the leader of the Union Grievance Committee. Sid and Babe are in opposite camps, yet romantic interest is sparked at their first encounter. Despite cajoling from her fellow garment workers, Babe appears to reject Sid ("I'm Not At All in Love"). Meanwhile, Hines is in love with Gladys Hotchkiss, the company president's secretary, but is pushing her away with his jealous behavior. After witnessing a fight between the couple, Sid's secretary, Mabel, tries to help Hines break from his jealous ways ("I'll Never Be Jealous Again"). Meanwhile, Sid, rejected again by Babe, is forced to confide his feelings to a dictaphone ("Hey There").

During the annual company picnic, kicked off with the official Sleep-Tite Company Anthem ("Sleep-Tite"), Hines demonstrates his knife throwing act while intoxicated, almost striking Babe while attempting to knock an apple off her head. Prez chases after Gladys, who rejects his advances ("Her Is"). Babe warms up to Sid, and they turn the entire picnic into a celebratory dance ("Once a Year Day"). As the picnic-goers head home, Prez turns his attentions to Mae, who responds in the positive far more quickly and aggressively than he'd expected ("Her Is (Reprise)"). At Babe's home, Sid's romantic overtures are deflected by Babe, who makes casual conversation on tangential subjects ("Small Talk"). Eventually the walls come down between the two, who admit their love for one another ("There Once Was a Man"), but their estrangement is reinforced when they return to the factory. A slow-down is staged by the union, strongly supported by Babe ("Racing with the Clock (Reprise)"). Sid, as factory superintendent, demands an "honest day's work" and threatens to fire slackers. Babe, however, is still determined to fight for their cause, and intentionally jams the factory line, causing a breakdown, and Sid reluctantly fires her. As she leaves, he begins to wonder again whether a romance with her is a mistake ("Hey There (Reprise)").

Act II

At the Union meeting, after a rallying speech by Prez, Gladys (Mae in the 2006 revival) performs for the rest of the union, with "the boys from the cutting room floor" ("Steam Heat"). After the main meeting, the Grievance Committee meets at Babe's house, to discuss further tactics, such as mismatching sizes of pajamas and sewing the fly-buttons onto the bottoms such that they are likely to come off and leave their wearer pants-less. At the meeting, as Prez and Mae's relationship is waning, Sid arrives and tries to smooth things over with Babe. Despite her feelings for Sid, she pushes him away ("Hey There (Reprise)").

Back at the factory, the girls reassure Hines, who is personally offended by the slow down, that he is doing nothing wrong ("Think of the Time I Save"). Hasler has a meeting in his office with Max, one of the company's traveling salesmen, about an incident that occurred in Peoria, Illinois. Hines is called in to try on pajama pants, which fall down in front of everybody just as Gladys walks in. Believing that he is fooling around, she angrily dismisses him. Sid, now convinced that Babe's championship of the union is justified, takes Gladys out for the evening to a night club, Hernando's Hideaway ("Hernando's Hideaway"), where he wheedles the key to the company's books from her. Hines and Babe each discover the pair and assume they are becoming romantically involved. Babe storms out, and Hines believes his jealous imaginings have come true ("I'll Never Be Jealous Again Ballet").

Using Gladys' key, Sid accesses the firm's books and discovers that Hasler, has already tacked on the extra seven and one-half cents to the production cost, but has kept all the extra profits for himself. Hines, still jealous out of his mind, has broken into Gladys' office, and flings knives past Sid and Gladys, narrowly missing an increasingly paranoid Mr. Hasler. After detaining Hines, Sid then brings about Hasler's consent to a pay raise and rushes to bring the news to the Union Rally, already in progress ("7½ Cents"). This news brings peace to the factory and to his love life, allowing him to reconnect with Babe ("There Once Was a Man (Reprise)"). Everyone goes out to celebrate at Hernando's Hideaway clothed in company brand pajamas ("The Pajama Game Finale").

Musical numbers

 Act I
 "The Pajama Game Opening" – Hines
 "Racing With the Clock" – Factory Workers
 "A New Town Is a Blue Town" – Sid
 "I'm Not At All in Love" – Babe and Factory Girls
 "I'll Never Be Jealous Again" – Mabel and Hines
 "Hey There" – Sid
 "Racing With the Clock" (Reprise) – Factory Workers
 "Sleep-Tite" – Company
 "Her Is" – Prez and Gladys
 "Once a Year Day" – Sid, Babe, and Company
 "Her Is" (Reprise) – Prez and Mae
 "Small Talk" – Sid and Babe
 "There Once Was a Man" – Sid and Babe
 "Hey There" (Reprise) – Sid

 Act II
 "Steam Heat" – Gladys (Mae in 2006) and the Box Boys
 "The World Around Us" (added to 2006 production) – Sid
 "Hey There" (Reprise) – Babe
 "If You Win, You Lose" (added to 2006 production) – Sid and Babe
 "Think of the Time I Save" – Hines and Factory Girls
 "Hernando's Hideaway" – Gladys and Company
 "The Three of Us (Me, Myself and I)" (added to 2006 production) – Hines and Gladys
 "7½ Cents" – Prez, Babe and Factory Workers
 "There Once Was a Man" (Reprise) – Sid and Babe
 "The Pajama Game Finale" – Full Company

Notes on the music
Two of the songs, "There Once Was a Man" and "A New Town Is a Blue Town", were actually written by Frank Loesser, although they were uncredited.

"Hernando's Hideaway"
For the 2006 revival, Harry Connick Jr. played the piano, when Gladys (Megan Lawrence), Sid, and Company were on stage for "Hernando's Hideaway".
"The length and form of the song remain steady", Kathleen Marshall said, "but he can improvise within it."

"Steam Heat"
In the original production, and in the film version, the famed dance number "Steam Heat" was danced by Gladys. In the 2006 revival, the number was made with Mae (Joyce Chittick), instead of Gladys. Kathleen Marshall explains: "Hines accuses Gladys of being a flirt, and she's not. So does it make sense that she'd go and strut her stuff in front of the whole union? Hines would say, 'Aha, you floozy, I caught you!' Also, she's the boss's secretary, so why would she be at a union meeting? I think it's much more fun that Gladys doesn't really let go until she goes out with Sid, gets real drunk, and throws caution to the wind."

New songs for the 2006 revival

"The Three of Us (Me, Myself and I)"
Words and music by Richard Adler; in 2006, Hines (Michael McKean) performed the new number, "The Three of Us" at show's end with Gladys (Megan Lawrence). At the time of the revival, Adler was quoted as saying that he wrote the song for Jimmy Durante in 1964. "It was written for Jimmy Durante", says McKean, "and Durante used to do it in his act, but he never recorded it, so it's kind of an orphan."  The song was actually featured in the 1966 television musical, Olympus 7-000, part of the ABC Stage 67 series which also produced Stephen Sondheim's Evening Primrose.  Eddie Foy Jr. (who had played Hines in the original Broadway and movie versions of The Pajama Game) introduced the song in Olympus 7-000 and sings it on the Command Records soundtrack album. Donald O'Connor, Larry Blyden and Phyllis Newman co-starred in the TV special with Foy.

"The World Around Us"
"The World Around Us" was part of the 1954 Broadway previews and opening, but was dropped during the first week of the Broadway run, replaced by Babe's reprise of "Hey There".  This would leave Sid with no songs in the second act, aside from the reprise of "There Once was a Man". The number was restored for the 2006 Broadway revival, allowing star Harry Connick Jr. to have a second-act song.

"If You Win, You Lose"
Words and music by Richard Adler; for the 1973 revival, in place of the second-act "Hey There" reprise, there was a new song, "Watch Your Heart". Retitled "If You Win, You Lose", the song has been included in recent productions of the show and was in the 2006 Broadway production.

Production history

Original Broadway
The original Broadway production opened at the St. James Theatre on May 13, 1954, and closed on November 24, 1956, after 1,063 performances.  It was directed by George Abbott and Jerome Robbins and was the first Broadway show to feature the choreography of Bob Fosse. The production's scenic designer and costume designer was Lemuel Ayers. The original cast included Eddie Foy Jr. (Hines), Stanley Prager (Prez), Gordon Woodbrun (Joe), Ralph Dunn (Hasler), Carol Haney (Gladys), John Raitt (Sid Sorokin), Reta Shaw (Mabel), Buzz Miller (Second Helper), Janis Paige (Babe Williams), Rae Allen (Poopsie) and Jack Waldron (Salesman).

This production is also noted for jump-starting the career of Shirley MacLaine. An unknown 20-year-old at the time, she was selected to understudy Carol Haney's role. Starting in late May 1954, MacLaine filled the role while Haney was out of commission with an injured ankle. Director/producer Hal B. Wallis was an audience member at one of MacLaine's performances, and signed her as a contract player for Paramount Pictures. The production received the Tony Award for Best Musical, and Carol Haney's performance and Bob Fosse's choreography were also honored.

Original London
The Pajama Game opened at the London Coliseum on 13 October 1955 and ran for 588 performances – an undoubted hit. Edmund Hockridge played Sid Sorokin and Joy Nichols played Babe Williams. Max Wall, in a rare outing to the musical stage, played Hines, Elizabeth Seal, who later found stardom playing the lead role in Irma La Douce, played Gladys, and Frank Lawless played Prez.

Original Australia and New Zealand 
The original Australian production presented by J.C. Williamson commenced at Her Majesty's Theatre, Melbourne on February 2, 1957.

The cast was led by Toni Lamond as Babe Williams and William Newman as Sid Sorokin, with Keith Petersen as Hines, Jill Perryman as Mabel, Don Richards as Prez and Tikki Taylor as Gladys.

It subsequently toured to Sydney's Empire Theatre, commencing June 12, 1957, followed by Her Majesty's Theatre, Brisbane from November 12, 1957. The show then made a return engagement to Her Majesty's Theatre, Melbourne, commencing Boxing Day, December 26, 1957.

The production continued touring through 1958, first to His Majesty's Theatre, Perth from May 3, 1958, then to Theatre Royal, Adelaide from June 18, 1958.

After its Australian season, the tour commenced its New Zealand season on February 10, 1958 at His Majesty's Theatre, Auckland, followed by the Grand Opera House, Wellington, from March 12, 1958, where it concluded its run.

Film, 1957
The film version was released by Warner Bros. in 1957 and featured the original stage cast except for Janis Paige, whose role is played by Doris Day, and Stanley Prager, whose role is played by Jack Straw.

Broadway revival, 1973
A Broadway revival opened on December 9, 1973, at the Lunt-Fontanne Theatre, but it closed on February 3, 1974, after just 65 performances.  It was directed by George Abbott, one of the two directors of the original production in 1954, with choreography by Zoya Leporska.  The cast included Hal Linden, Barbara McNair, and Cab Calloway as Hines.

West End, 1999 
A West End revival arrived at the Victoria Palace Theatre in October 1999 having originated at Birmingham Rep and transferred to the Victoria Palace via Toronto. Directed by Simon Callow, it briefly starred Ulrika Johnson as Babe (Birmingham Rep), but she left the production when it travelled to Toronto where Babe was played by Camilla Scott, then in London, Leslie Ashe. Sid Sorokin was played by Graham Bickley throughout, earning himself a Dora Award nomination for 'Outstanding Performance by a male in a Principal Role' in Toronto. It also starred John Hegley and Anita Dobson with choreography by David Bintley. It closed on 18 December 1999.

Broadway, 2006
The Roundabout Theatre Company revival, produced by special arrangement with Jeffrey Richards, James Fuld Jr. and Scott Landis, opened on February 23, 2006 and closed on June 17, 2006, after 129 performances (and 41 previews). Kathleen Marshall was choreographer and director, with a cast starring Harry Connick Jr., making his Broadway acting debut as Sid, Kelli O'Hara as Babe, Michael McKean as Hines, Roz Ryan as Mabel, and Megan Lawrence as Gladys. The revival included three added songs by Richard Adler. The original book by George Abbott and Richard Bissell was revised by Peter Ackerman. This revival cast made a recording that was included in full on the two-part album Harry on Broadway, Act I with Connick Jr. and O'Hara recording a second set of selections from the 2001 musical Thou Shalt Not.

Chichester Festival Theatre and West End, 2013/2014
Directed by Richard Eyre, the UK 2013 revival of The Pajama Game opened on April 22 at Chichester Festival Theatre's Minerva Theatre and the cast included television personality Gary Wilmot. The production's sold-out run at Chichester ended on 8 June 2013, and on 1 May 2014 it transferred to the West End's Shaftesbury Theatre. The West End transfer received positive reviews from a number of national media outlets. The production ran for a limited season at the Shaftesbury Theatre, closing on 13 September 2014.

Awards and nominations

Original Broadway production

2006 Broadway revival

Recordings
The 1954 cast recording, originally issued by Columbia Records and currently available on Sony Masterworks.
The 1957 film soundtrack recording, originally issued by Columbia Records and currently available on Collectables Records.
An EP of the Australian cast was recorded during the New Zealand leg of the tour. The track list included "The Pajama Game", "Her Is", "Hey There", "I'll Never Be Jealous Again", and "7 1/2 Cents".
The cast recording for the 2006 revival is a two-disc set: The first disc contains the Broadway cast recording from The Pajama Game; and as a suggestion from the Sony record company, there is a second disc, which contains new recordings of songs from Harry Connick, Jr.'s, compositions for the 2001 musical Thou Shalt Not, performed by Harry Connick Jr., and Kelli O'Hara. The double album is produced by Tracey Freeman and Harry Connick Jr.

References

External links

The Pajama Game (2006) at broadway.com
The Pajama Game (2006) Reviews
Video feature: Opening Night: The Pajama Game (2006)

The Pajama Game Music Theatre International website
Phoenix Entertainment Tour

1954 musicals
Broadway musicals
Musicals based on novels
Musicals by Richard Adler
Musicals by Jerry Ross
Musicals choreographed by Bob Fosse
Plays set in Iowa
Tony Award for Best Musical
Tony Award-winning musicals